The Langhe (Langa is from old dialect Mons Langa et Bassa Langa) is a hilly area to the south and east of the river Tanaro in the province of Cuneo and in the province of Asti in Piedmont, northern Italy.

It is famous for its wines, cheeses, and truffles—particularly the white truffles of Alba. The countryside as it was in the first half of the 20th century features prominently in the writings of Beppe Fenoglio and Cesare Pavese, who was born there, in Santo Stefano Belbo.

On 22 June 2014, a part of the Langhe was inscribed on UNESCO's World Heritage list for its cultural landscapes, outstanding living testimony to winegrowing and winemaking traditions that stem from a long history, and that have been continuously improved and adapted up to the present day. They bear witness to an extremely comprehensive social, rural and urban realm, and to sustainable economic structures. They include a multitude of harmonious built elements that bear witness to its history and its professional practices. 

Its vineyards constitute an outstanding example of man’s interaction with his natural environment. Following a long and slow evolution of winegrowing expertise, the best possible adaptation of grape varieties to land with specific soil and climatic components has been carried out, which in itself is related to winemaking expertise, thereby becoming an international benchmark. The winegrowing landscape also expresses great aesthetic qualities, making it into an archetype of European vineyards.

Crutin cheese is made in Langhe.

In geology, the Langhian Age of the Miocene Epoch is named for the Langhe region.

Viticulture
DOC and DOCG wines produced in this area include:
Arneis
Barbera d'Alba
Barolo
Barbaresco
Dolcetto d'Alba
Dogliani
Dolcetto delle Langhe Monregalesi
Dolcetto delle Langhe Monregalesi superiore
Langhe Arneis
Langhe Chardonnay
Langhe Chardonnay Vigna
Langhe Dolcetto
Langhe Favorita
Langhe Favorita Vigna
Langhe Freisa
Langhe Freisa Vigna
Langhe Nebbiolo
Langhe bianco
Langhe rosso

Note

External links
Information on The Langhe Piemonte
Langhe and territory, a complete portal about Langhe, the territory, the cities and the wines. English version.
"Langhe Doc"  documentary movie filmed in Langhe Region; 2011
Official UNESCO photo selection
Complete UNESCO photo gallery before selection

 
Wine regions of Italy
Vineyard Landscape of Piedmont: Langhe-Roero and Monferrato